Michael Dark (born September 17, 1963) is a Canadian retired ice hockey defenceman. Dark played 43 NHL games for the St. Louis Blues.

Dark was born in Sarnia, Ontario, Canada.

Awards and honors

References

External links

1963 births
Living people
Canadian ice hockey defencemen
Sportspeople from Sarnia
Brantford Smoke players
Flint Bulldogs players
Montreal Canadiens draft picks
New Haven Nighthawks players
Peoria Rivermen (IHL) players
Peterborough Pirates players
Port Huron Border Cats players
RPI Engineers men's ice hockey players
Salt Lake Golden Eagles (IHL) players
St. Louis Blues players
St. Thomas Wildcats players
Ice hockey people from Ontario
NCAA men's ice hockey national champions
AHCA Division I men's ice hockey All-Americans